Paiboon Unyapo (born 14 July 1948) is a Thai former footballer who competed in the 1968 Summer Olympics.

References

External links
 

1948 births
Living people
Paiboon Unyapo
Paiboon Unyapo
Footballers at the 1968 Summer Olympics
Southeast Asian Games medalists in football
Paiboon Unyapo
Association football midfielders
Competitors at the 1969 Southeast Asian Peninsular Games
Paiboon Unyapo